Joinville is the largest city in Santa Catarina, in the Southern Region of Brazil. It is the third largest municipality in the southern region of Brazil, after the much larger state capitals of Curitiba and Porto Alegre. Joinville is also a major industrial, financial and commerce center.

The city has a very high human development index (0.809) among Brazilian municipalities, occupying the 21st national position. One study pointed to Joinville as the second best city to live in Brazil. Joinville holds the titles of "Brazilian Manchester", "City of Flowers", "City of the Princes", "City of Bicycles" and "City of Dance". It is known for hosting the Joinville Dance Festival (considered the largest dance festival in the world), as well as for having the only branch of the Bolshoi Ballet School outside Russia in the world.

In 2020, the population of Joinville was estimated at 597,658 people, many of whom are of Portuguese, German, Swiss, Norwegian and Italian descent. The metropolitan area is home to 1,340,997 residents according to the 2010 census by IBGE, thus, the most populous metropolitan region of the state of Santa Catarina.

Owing to urban development and relatively good infrastructure, Joinville has become a major center for events and business conferences. The city has one of the highest standards of living in Latin America.

History 

The area surrounding Joinville had been inhabited by the Guarani people for approximately 7,000 years.

Even though it is considered a German-Brazilian city, its origins are French: the area of Joinville was the Colônia Dona Francisca, designated as the dowry to be given to the future husband of Princess Francisca of Brazil, sister of Emperor Pedro II. In 1843, Francisca married François d'Orléans, Prince de Joinville, son of King Louis-Philippe of France, making him the owner of the lands.

In 1851, after the fall of the French monarchy, the French prince negotiated the use of part of his Brazilian lands with German Senator Mathias Schröder, founder of the Colonization Society of Hamburg. This society, made up of bankers, businessmen and merchants, attracted Northern European immigrants to travel to colonize Brazil and establish European communities there. In 1851, the first 118 German and Swiss immigrants arrived in the Brazilian Joinville, followed by 74 Norwegian immigrants. A Royal Palace was built in the city for the prince and princess of Joinville.

From 1851 to 1888, the city of Joinville received 17,000 German immigrants.

Founding

The city of Joinville was founded by German, Norwegian, Swiss settlers on 9 March 1851. Immigrants from Norway made up a group of men with several professional qualifications, including carpenters, masons, bakers, agriculturalists, and even a veterinarian and physician. Many of the first Norwegian settlers became ill by dysentery, typhoid, and other illnesses. In the first letter home, dated to July 1851, the author explained that "only" four Norwegians were dead so far: Simon Hansen of Helgeland, Lars C. Steensem of Ytterøy, Hans Petter Luttersen of Horten, and Martin Nordby of Larvik. Between 1851–1852, 41 Norwegians left Joinville and seven died.

A monument was erected by Rio Cachoeira in the city centre in 2001, in honor of the Norwegian, Swiss, and German settlers.

Geography

Joinville is located in the northeast of the state of Santa Catarina, close to the Atlantic coast, and is crossed by the river Cachoeira. It is not far from the border with the state of Paraná and its capital, Curitiba. The city is surrounded by the municipalities of Garuva, São Francisco do Sul, Araquari, Guaramirim, Schroeder, Jaraguá do Sul and Campo Alegre (this one in the microregion of São Bento do Sul).

The city contains a port on Babitonga Bay (Baía da Babitonga), which leads to the Atlantic Ocean and provides an important route for exporting manufactured products.
In 2006–07 there were public discussions about creating a Baía da Babitonga Wildlife Reserve to manage the mangroves, fishery and aquaculture in the bay.
This was defeated by politicians and businesspeople who were concerned about the impact on planned projects including a port expansion.

Climate
Joinville has a humid subtropical climate (Cfa in the Köppen climate classification data). In some rare cases, Joinville gets hit by South Atlantic cyclones, the most notable being Cyclone Catarina in 2004. Although Joinville lies outside the tropic zone, because of its low altitude and proximity to the Atlantic Ocean, it sees relatively little temperature variation throughout the year, with every month seeing average highs in the 20s C.

Neighbourhoods

Adhemar Garcia
América
Anita Garibaldi
Atiradores
Aventureiro
Boa Vista
Boehmerwald
Bom Retiro
Bucarein
Centro
Comasa
Costa e Silva
Dona Francisca
Espinheiros
Fátima
Floresta
Glória
Guanabara
Iririú
Itaum
Itinga
Itoupava Açu
Jardim Iririú
Jardim Paraíso
Jardim Sophia
Jarivatuba
João Costa
Morro do Meio
Nova Brasília
Paranaguamirim
Parque Guarani
Petrópolis
Pirabeiraba-centro
Rio Bonito
Rio Velho
Saguaçu
Santa Catarina
Santo Antônio
São Marcos
Vila Cubatão
Vila Nova
Zona Industrial Norte
Zona Industrial Tupy

Culture

Joinville is famous for its strong German-influenced culture. The city retains many aspects of German culture, in its architecture, in the local dishes, parties and in the way of life of its inhabitants.

Joinville is the host city of the Festival de Dança de Joinville (Joinville Dance Festival) which is the world's largest dance event, held every year during the month of July. Joinville is the only city outside of Moscow to have a school of the Bolshoi Ballet, the renowned Russian Ballet Company. The city is home to a Catholic bishop, several Lutheran churches (one of the largest communities in Brazil), a Botanical Garden and a Zoo. Parks, and several beaches are less than an hour's drive away from the city.  Joinville is also home to several museums including the "MUBI" bicycle museum.

The Royal Palace, built in the mid-19th century, nowadays is a designated National Museum of Immigration History, specifically detailing the struggle and hardship German immigrants went through on their journey to Brazil in the 1800s. It has furniture and costumes dating back to the mid-19th century.

International Dance Festival

Every year since 1982, Joinville's Dance Festival gathers in the city thousands of professional dancers and viewers from all over the world. The festival always takes place in the second half of July. The 11 days of presentations attract around 50 thousand people to Centreventos Cau Hansen, making it one of the largest events of its kind in the world. Joinville's Dance Festival has even received a mention in the 2005 edition of the Guinness Book of World Records as the world's "largest dance festival". There are competitions in seven different categories, from classical ballet to folk dances. Squares, shopping centres and many companies take the opportunity to promote other events at the same time, such as courses and talks.

Industrial tourism
With a population of over half a million inhabitants and an economy based mainly on industry, Joinville has become the largest city in State of Santa Catarina.

Economy

Joinville's economy is based on industrial activities and commerce. The city is also the center to some of Brazil's largest software companies such as
, Logocenter, Microvix and SoftExpert.

Joinville is also home to numerous large corporations in Brazil such as Tupy, Tigre, Embraco, Döhler, Whirlpool, Wetzel, Busscar, Ciser, Schulz S/A.

The city has one of the highest standards of living in Brazil. Its industrial output is the third-largest in the Southern States of Brazil, after the large main cities of Porto Alegre and Curitiba. Joinville is also the third most populous city in the southern region of Brazil, after the neighboring state capitals of Curitiba and Porto Alegre.

General Motors opened a motors factory in Joinville in 2012. It plans to invest up to US$1 billion in the coming years in another plant next to its new plant and a full assembly line is in the works for the future. 

The neighboring town of Araquari is home to a BMW car manufacturing plant;  the headquarters of are in Joinville.

Demographics
European Brazilians compose most of the city's population, tracing their origins mostly from Southern and Central Europe. A minority of the population (7.32%) are Black or Pardo (Brown-colored multiracials).

Source: IBGE 2000.

Religion
The first settlers were mainly Lutherans but, nowadays, followers of this religion make up only 6.13% of the population. Today, most of the Protestants are of Pentecostal faith. The first congregation of the Church of Jesus Christ of Latter-day Saints in Brazil was organized in Joinville.  The main religion, as in most of Brazil, is Roman Catholicism.

Source: IBGE 2000.

Education

Joinville is proud to have the best public education in Santa Catarina, recognized by the Ministry of Education. Schools, in general, have good infrastructure. The schooling rate (for people aged 6 to 14 years) was 97.3 in 2010. This placed the municipality in position 230 of 295 among the cities of the state and in position 3221 of 5570 among the cities of Brazil. 

English and Spanish are part of the official high school curriculum. As most of Joinville's inhabitants are of German ancestry, the German language is also taught in some schools.

Colleges and universities

State and Federal
 UFSC - Federal University of Santa Catarina
 IFSC - Federal Institute of Santa Catarina
 UDESC - Universidade do Estado de Santa Catarina

Private
 ACE - Associação Catarinense de Ensino
 FCJ - Faculdade Cenecista de Joinville
 CATÓLICA - 
 IELUSC - Instituto Superior e Centro Educacional Luterano Bom Jesus
 IESVILLE - Instituto de Ensino Superior de Joinville
 INESA - Instituto de Ensino Superior Santo Antônio
 SENAI - Serviço Nacional de Aprendizagem Industrial
 SOCIESC - Sociedade Educacional de Santa Catarina (pt Wikipedia)
 UNIVILLE - Universidade da Região de Joinville

Transportation

Domestic airport
Joinville-Lauro Carneiro de Loyola Airport (IATA code: JOI) is a minor airport in southern Brazil and serves only domestic flights.

Highways
The city is served by Harold Nielson Bus Station. It is run by Seinfra and has two floors and eighteen companies, with buses that make intercity and interstate journeys daily. Passenger traffic occurs twenty-four hours a day, with sale of tickets varying from company to company.

Health

Joinville has specialized clinics mainly in surgery, pediatrics, psychiatry, obstetrics, dentistry, neurology, ophthalmology, otorhinolaryngology, gynecology, urology, endocrinology, orthopedics, nephrology, among others. By 2011, the city had seven hospitals, 635 doctors' offices, 86 dental offices, 54 health posts, 146 pharmacies, 4 emergency rooms and 36 ambulances. Besides the seven hospitals, the city still has: Maternity Darci Vargas; Pro-Rim Institute, reference in the country; Sadalla Amin Ghanem Hospital of Eyes.

The average infant mortality rate in the city is 7.57 for 1000 live births. The hospitalizations due to diarrhea are 0.2 for every 1,000 inhabitants. Compared to all municipalities in the state, it is in positions 155 of 295 and 235 of 295, respectively. When compared to cities throughout Brazil, these positions are 3759 of 5570 and 4284 of 5570, respectively.

Sport

The city also offers leisure options in sports: there is a golf course, equestrian centre and a kart track. For outdoor activities lovers, there are places suitable for practicing any sport, from shooting (German tradition from the Middle Ages, kept until today) to adventure and nautical - the largest and best equipped Yacht Club in Santa Catarina State is in the municipality.
The city also hosts famous teams of basketball, salon (Indoors) football and volleyball, all of them highly recognised in the national leagues.

Sporting clubs
Joinville Esporte Clube (abbreviation: JEC).

On 8 December 2013, Joinville made headlines in the sport world when the game between Clube Atlético Paranaense and Vasco da Gama-RJ at Arena Joinville, the main football stadium in town was interrupted by violent fights between fans. The game was part of the last qualifying games of the Premier league "Serie A" in Brazil - Atlético Paranaense were fighting for a position in the Libertadores Cup and Vasco da Gama was fighting not to be relegated to the lower league "Serie B". Atlético Paranaense were hosting a game in Joinville after already being penalized for violence in its own arena in Curitiba, Paraná (120 km away from Joinville).

Notable people
 Eduardo Fischer, swimmer
 Jovani Furlan, ballet dancer
 Luma Grothe, fashion model
 Maurício Gugelmin, former Formula One and ChampCar driver
 Juarez Machado, artist
 Ana Cláudia Michels, fashion model
 Vitor Miranda, thaiboxer and martial artist
 Márcia Narloch, gold medal winner in the women's marathon at the 2003 Pan American Games
 Daniel Orzechowski, swimmer
 Tiago Splitter, basketball player

References

External links 

Official local government site - 

 
German-Brazilian culture
Populated places established in 1851
1851 establishments in Brazil
Municipalities in Santa Catarina (state)